House for Hunger was a tour by musician Avicii announced in 2011 where Avicii donated his entire income from the tour to the charity Feeding America.

Overview 
The tour featured 26 shows in 27 days and raised over $1 million for Feeding America which was estimated to provide 8 million meals to families across the United States.

The tours efforts were continued in 2013 with Avicii again donating funds during two Grammy week performances to the FEED Foundation. Chairman and co-founder of Feeding America, Lauren Bush said “We’re thrilled to be the beneficiary of Avicii and House of Hunger’s continued efforts to raise funds for the fight against hunger. Avicii is truly leading the charge in inspiring young people, and the house music industry, to get involved and to give back.” The donation was estimated to provide 2 million school meals to programs in the most impoverished parts of Africa.

Tour dates

References

2012 concert tours
Avicii